Candelaria, officially the Municipality of Candelaria,  is a 3rd class municipality in the province of Zambales, Philippines. According to the 2020 census, it has a population of 30,263 people.

History
During the pre-Spanish era, the area of Candelaria was unsettled forest. The Spanish East Indies government made it a sitio of Masinloc, one of the oldest towns of Zambales. Sambal settlers from other parts of Masinloc, who found Candelaria an ideal location to live, played an important role in creating Candelaria as a separate town in 1870.

The name of the town could have come from the name of the wife of the first Alcalde Mayor, who named the town after her as a birthday gift. Candelaria is also the Spanish word for Candlemas, and that the Virgin of Candelaria is a Marian title popular in the Hispanic world.

Geography
This municipality is known for Uacon Lake, the cleanest lake in Central Luzon, and for its numerous beach resorts.

Barangays

Candelaria is politically subdivided into 16 barangays.

Climate

Demographics

Economy

References

External links

 Candelaria Profile at PhilAtlas.com
 [ Philippine Standard Geographic Code]
Philippine Census Information

Municipalities of Zambales
1870 in the Philippines